Haiku Tracker is a graphical user interface for managing files of the Haiku operating system. It is somewhat similar to Finder on Mac OS 9 and Mac OS X.

Haiku Tracker is based on OpenTracker which in turn is based on Tracker found in the BeOS.

History

The original Tracker was created by Be Inc., as part of BeOS, but was opensourced in late 2000. The project was managed by Be until its close-down in late 2001, when it moved to SourceForge under the guidance of Axel Dörfler, the chief non-Be contributor. It is under the OpenTracker License, which is a barely modified BSD license that allows the use of the Be trademark Tracker to be used.

Deskbar
The Deskbar is a taskbar that is by default placed in the upper right corner of the screen of the Haiku operating system. It is composed of the deskbar menu, the tray (clock information panel) and the list of running programs. The Tracker is always shown on the top of the list of running programs.

Using Tracker

Mounting Volumes
In order to access any memory device for the first time the user has to mount the volume, that means, let the system know it is there. This is done with a right-click on the Desktop, then choosing volume from the Mount submenu, which is also found in Deskbar.

Drilling down the submenus
This is a useful feature of the Tracker. Instead of double-clicking in order to open a folder, the user can right-click and move down the hierarchy in the submenu. Every folder is represented by another submenu, not by new window.

Transaction status
The Tracker shows the progress of copying, moving or deleting files. It also lets the user stop or pause current transactions.

See also
 BeOS
 Haiku (operating system)
 Comparison of file managers
 Taskbar

External links

 
 Haiku Tracker on the Haiku user Guide
 Haiku Deskbar on the Haiku user Guide

BeOS software
Free file managers
Software using the BSD license